Sidsel may refer to:

Sidsel Bauck (1929–2005), Norwegian trade unionist and politician
Sidsel Dalen (born 1969), Norwegian journalist and crime fiction writer
Sidsel Ekholdt (born 1956), retired Norwegian artistic gymnast
Sidsel Endresen (born 1952), Norwegian singer, composer, and actress
Sidsel Meineche Hansen (born 1981), visual artist based in London
Sidsel Mørck (born 1937), Norwegian poet, novelist and columnist
Sidsel Bodholt Nielsen (born 1989), former Danish handball player
Sidsel Owren, Norwegian ski-orienteering competitor
Sidsel Ben Semmane (born 1988), Danish musician known by the stage name Sémmane
Sidsel Ulfstand (died 1575), Danish (Scanian) landholder and county administrator
Sidsel Wold (born 1959), Norwegian journalist and non-fiction writer

See also
MT Sidsel Knutsen, Norwegian oil tanker built in 1993
Sidsel Sidsærk (English: Lisbeth Longfrock), a classical work of Norwegian literature by author Hans Aanrud, published in 1903